Blastodacna ochrella is a moth in the family Elachistidae. It is found in Japan (Hokkaido, Honshu).

The length of the forewings is 5-5.8 mm. The forewings are ochreous, edged with dark brown along the costal margin and termen and with two blackish tufts of raised scales. The hindwings are grey-brownish. Adults are on wing from late May to early July.

References

Moths described in 2004
Blastodacna